The Ukraine national speedway team are motorcycle speedway national team from Ukraine. They were started in the European Pairs Speedway Championship Finals three times.

World championships

Speedway World Cup

European Championships

Pairs

Team U-19

Honours

World Championships

European Championships

See also
 motorcycle speedway

National speedway teams
Speedway
Team